Ibrahim Al-Otaybi (born 15 January 1997) is a Saudi Arabian professional footballer who plays for Al-Ula as a midfielder.

Career 
Al-Otaybi he joined Al-Taawoun's youth team . On 16 May 2019, Al-Otaybi made his professional debut for Al-Taawoun against Al-Faisaly in the Pro League, replacing Rabee Sufyani . he renewed his contract with Al-Taawoun on 7 October 2019

Career statistics

Club

Honours

Club
Al-Taawoun
King Cup: 2019

References

External links

1997 births
Living people
Saudi Arabian footballers
Al-Taawoun FC players
Al-Diriyah Club players
Al-Ula FC players
Saudi Professional League players
Saudi First Division League players
Saudi Third Division players
Association football midfielders